Ladislav Martan (born 2 October 1989 in Varnsdorf,  Czechoslovakia) is a Czech football striker currently playing for SK Dynamo České Budějovice.

Career

České Budějovice
Martan joined SK Dynamo České Budějovice in January 2019. On 3 September 2019, he returned to FK Viktoria Žižkov on loan for the rest of 2019.

References

External links 
 
 

Living people
1989 births
Czech footballers
Czech First League players
Czech National Football League players
FC Slovan Liberec players
FK Viktoria Žižkov players
FK Varnsdorf players
1. FC Slovácko players
FC Hradec Králové players
SK Dynamo České Budějovice players
Association football forwards
People from Varnsdorf
Sportspeople from the Ústí nad Labem Region